Sunan Abu Dawood is one of the Kutub al-Sittah (six major hadith collections), collected by Abu Dawud al-Sijistani (d.889).

Introduction
Abu Dawood compiled twenty-one books related to Hadith and preferred those  (plural of "Hadith") which were supported by the example of the companions of Muhammad. As for the contradictory , he states under the heading of 'Meat acquired by hunting for a pilgrim': "if there are two contradictory reports from the Prophet (SAW), an investigation should be made to establish what his companions have adopted". He wrote in his letter to the people of Mecca: "I have disclosed wherever there was too much weakness in regard to any tradition in my collection. But if I happen to leave a Hadith without any comment, it should be considered as sound, albeit some of them are more authentic than others". The Mursal Hadith (a tradition in which a companion is omitted and a successor narrates directly from Muhammad) has also been a matter of discussion among the traditionists. Abu Dawood states in his letter to the people of Mecca: "If a Musnad Hadith (uninterrupted tradition) is not contrary to a Mursal [Hadith], or a Musnad Hadith is not found, then the Mursal Hadith will be accepted though it would not be considered as strong as a Muttasil Hadith (uninterrupted chain)".

The traditions in Sunan Abu Dawood are divided in three categories. The first category consists of those of the traditions that are mentioned by Bukhari and/or Muslim. The second type of traditions are those which fulfil the conditions of Bukhari or Muslim. At this juncture, it should be remembered that Bukhari said, "I only included in my book Sahih Bukhari authentic traditions, and left out many more authentic ones than these to avoid unnecessary length".

Description
Abu Dawood collected 500,000 hadith, but included only 4,800 in this collection. Sunnis regard this collection as fourth in strength of their six major hadith collections. It took Abu Dawod 20 years to collect the hadiths. He made a series of journeys to meet most of the foremost traditionists of his time and acquired from them the most reliable hadiths, quoting sources through which it reached him. Since the author collected hadiths which no one had ever assembled together, his sunan has been accepted as a standard work by scholars from many parts of the Islamic world, especially after Ibn al-Qaisarani's inclusion of it in the formal canonization of the six major collections.

Abu Dawood started traveling and collecting ahadeeth at a young age. He traveled to many places in the middle east, including Egypt, Iraq, and Syria. Abu Dawood also studied under Imam Ahmad Ibn Hanbal.

Contents
Editor, Muhammad Muhyiddin Abd al-Hamid's 1935, Cairo publication, in 4 volumes, provides the standard topical classification of the hadith Arabic text. Sunan Abu Dawood is divided into 43 'books'.

Commentaries and translations
Sunan Abu Dawood has been translated into numerous languages. The Australian Islamic Library has collected 11 commentaries on this book in Arabic, Urdu and Indonesian. One of the best commentaries for Sunan Abu Dawood had been written by Khalil Ahmad Saharanpuri entitled Badhl Al-Majhud Fi Hall Abi Dawud, an 18-volume commentary on the hadith.

See also
 Sahih Bukhari
 Sahih Muslim
 Jami al-Tirmidhi
 Sunan al-Sughra
 Either: Sunan ibn Majah, Muwatta Malik

References

External links
 
 Sunan Abu Dawud online at Sunnah.com
 Translation and Commentaries in English, Urdu, Arabic and Indonesian Languages
 English translation of Sunan Abu Dawud

9th-century Arabic books
Sunni literature
Hadith studies
Sunni hadith collections